Afbarwaaqo or Afbarwaqo is a town located in Mudug region of Galmudug state of Somalia. It is located 176 km northeast of the provincial capital of Galkayo.

References

References

Populated places in Mudug
Galmudug